Obando, officially the Municipality of Obando,  is a 2nd class municipality in the province of Bulacan, Philippines. According to the 2020 census, it has a population of 59,978 people.

History
Obando was likely originally called "Binuwangan" according to 18th century maps. In the 1734 map of the Philippine islands by Pedro Murillo Velarde, the places labeled "Vinuangan", "Polo" (currently Valenzuela), and "Maycauayan" were indicated separately and proximate to one another.

In the 18th century, the municipalities now known as Meycauayan, Valenzuela (formerly Polo) and Obando comprised only one town, the Municipality of Meycauayan. The town of Polo and Obando, formed a barrio called Catanghalan. In the year 1623, the municipality of Polo was organized which included the present-day territories of the Town of Obando. By virtue of a decree promulgated during the time of Governor and Captain General of the Archipelago, Francisco Jose de Obando y Solis, the town was created and separated from its mother town Polo on May 14, 1753. In the Governor's untimely death at the hands of the British during the Seven Years' War, the creation and establishment of the town was made and attended by the Alcalde Mayor of the province, Don Francisco Morales y Mozabe, the Provincial Minister, S. Gregorio, Rev. Fr. Alejandro Ferrer, together with numerous religious devotees. The minister who was chosen to administer the town was Rev. Fr. Manuel De Olivencia.

In 1907, Obando was made an independent town of Bulacan. Then through the untiring efforts of the municipal officials, a portion of Gasak, Navotas was reclaimed to form a part of Obando. The municipal officials, believing that this portion was once a part of the municipality but was adopted by Navotas in the course of time, effortlessly pushed through its claim to regain the area. The concerted action of all those concerned paid off when on January 30, 1975, by virtue of a Presidential Decree No. 646, a portion of approximately 1.78 square kilometers of Gasak, Navotas was returned to Obando. This is mostly fishpond and sandy beach and believed that when fully developed, this will serve as a good tourist attraction. By resolution of 1975 Municipal Council, the area was made into a barangay and named it Nuestra Señora de Salambao in honor of one of its patron saints.

Geography
Obando is bordered by Valenzuela in the east, Navotas and Malabon in the south, Bulakan in the north, and the waters of Manila Bay in the west.

Flat and low-lying coastal plains characterize the general topography of Obando. The area was formerly an estuary, but it filled up partially from the peripheral parts of each sand bar and sand spit and formed up into current figure that mainly consisted of commercial district, partly industrial district, residential area and fishpond. Within the municipality are two rivers and three creeks namely Meycauayan River, in the north, Pinagkabalian River, in the south and Paco Creek, Hulo Creek and Pag-asa Creek traversing the town parallel to the provincial road.

Obando, just like the other towns of Bulacan, has two pronounced seasons: dry and wet season. The wet season is from May to October and the dry season is from November to April. The rainfall of the wet season accounts for about 80% of the annual rainfall, which is due to west monsoons and typhoons.

Barangays
Obando is politically subdivided into 11 barangays (8 urban, 3 rural). Barangays Binuangan (ancient "Binwangan" mentioned on the Laguna Copperplate Inscription which is the oldest written document of Philippines inscribed in Indianized script dates back to 900 CE) and Salambao are located along the Paliwas River, and can only be reached by means of motorized boats.

Climate

Demographics

In 2002, Obando had an estimated population of 58,245 wherein 49% are male and 51% are female. Of the current population, about 14% live in rural barangays while the rest constitute the urban population. There are 12,349 households. The average monthly income of a household is P9,000.00, slightly below the P9,540.00 minimum for a family of 6 threshold set by Department of Social Welfare and Development.

Economy

Radio

Obando is also the transmitter site of some AM stations, primarily broadcasting the Mega Manila area. Among them are: 
 Super Radyo DZBB 594 (GMA Network)
 DZMM Radyo Patrol 630 (ABS-CBN Corporation, defunct)
 DWIZ 882 (Aliw Broadcasting Corporation)
 DZIQ Radyo Inquirer 990 (Trans-Radio Broadcasting Corporation, defunct)
 DZEC Radyo Agila 1062 (Eagle Broadcasting Corporation)
 INC Radio DZEM 954 (Christian Era Broadcasting Service International)
 DZME 1530 (Capitol Broadcasting Center)

Government

Elected officials

 Mayor: Leonardo D. Valeda (NUP)
 Vice Mayor: Arvin E. dela Cruz (NUP)
 Municipal Council:
 Rowell S. Rillera (NUP)
 Drandren R. de Ocampo (PDP-Laban)
 Felipe F. dela Cruz (PDP-Laban)
 Lawrance R. Banag (Independent)
 Evangeline B. Bautista (NUP)
 Crina Babes P. Ramos (PDP-Laban)
 Michael L. dela Paz (NUP)
 Aries Joseph C. Manalaysay (NUP)

List of mayors
 Antonio Joaquin (OIC 1986 - 1989)
 Bienvenido Evangelista (1989–1992)
 Conrado Lumabas Jr. (1992–2001)
 Onesimo Joaquin (2001–2004)
 Zoilito Santiago (2004–2007)
 Orencio Gabriel (2007–2013)
 Edwin C. Santos (2013–2022)
Leonardo Valeda (2022–Present)

List of vice mayors 
Vice Mayors of Obando:
 Remigio Dela Cruz (1988–1992)
 Gaudioso Espinosa (1992–1995)
 Romerico Roque Santos (1995–1998)
 Onesimo Joaquin (1998–2001)
 Zoilito Santiago (2001–2004)
 Jose Correa (2004–2007)
 Leonardo Pantanilla (2007–2010)
 Danilo de Ocampo (2010–2013)
 Zoilito Santiago (2013–2016)
 Arvin Dela Cruz (2016–Present)

Gallery

See also
Obando Fertility Rites
Obando Church
Colegio de San Pascual Baylon

References

External links

Obando Bulacan
elgu2.ncc.gov.ph
 [ Philippine Standard Geographic Code]
Philippine Census Information

Municipalities of Bulacan
Populated places on Manila Bay